Wielka Niedźwiedzianka is a river of Poland, a tributary of the Niedźwiedzianka.

Rivers of Poland